The 1989–90 season was the 44th season of competitive football played by Dinamo Zagreb. The season was marked by a football riot on May 13, 1990, at Maksimir Stadium in Zagreb on a match between Dinamo Zagreb and Red Star Belgrade.

Squad

First Federal League

Matches

Classification

Yugoslav Cup

See also
1989–90 Yugoslav First League
1989–90 Yugoslav Cup
Dinamo Zagreb-Red Star Belgrade riot

References
Yugoslavia - List of Final Tables
Tempo almanah - Yu fudbal 1989–90

1989-90
Yugoslav football clubs 1989–90 season